Munich-Fasanerie station is a railway station in the Feldmoching-Hasenbergl borough of Munich, Germany.

References

External links

Fasanerie
Fasanerie
Railway stations in Germany opened in 1896
1896 establishments in Bavaria